The following is a list of characters from the Disney animated film media franchise of Zootopia.

Main characters

Judy Hopps
Officer Judith Laverne "Judy" Hopps (voiced by Ginnifer Goodwin) is a female rabbit and the main protagonist of Zootopia. She becomes Zootopia's first police rabbit, seeing an opportunity to prove herself by solving the mystery of the disappearance of several citizens.

Nick Wilde
Nicholas Piberius "Nick" Wilde (voiced by Jason Bateman) is a con-artist fox in the city of Zootopia who finds himself compelled to aid Officer Judy Hopps, a rabbit, in her investigation. Despite their differences, Nick forms a friendship with Judy, who helps him realize he can be more than his stereotype. Nick makes good on this lesson by becoming a police officer and Judy's partner.

Supporting characters
Chief Bogo (voiced by Idris Elba), an African buffalo who is the police chief of the Zootopia Police Department's 1st Precinct.
Officer Benjamin Clawhauser (voiced by Nate Torrence), an obese cheetah who works as a dispatcher and desk sergeant for the Zootopia Police Department's 1st Precinct.
Dawn Bellwether (voiced by Jenny Slate) is a diminutive female sheep. She is the former assistant mayor of the city of Zootopia. At first glance, Bellwether appears to be meek, sweet, and energetic, albeit overworked. She is revealed to be orchestrating a plot to cause conflict in the city and seize power.
Stu Hopps (voiced by Don Lake), a rabbit from Bunnyburrow who is Judy Hopps' father and a carrot farmer.
Bonnie Hopps (voiced by Bonnie Hunt), a rabbit from Bunnyburrow who is Judy Hopps' mother.
Yax (voiced by Tommy Chong), a laid-back domestic yak who owns the naturist club Mystic Springs Oasis in Sahara Square.
Mayor Lionheart (voiced by J. K. Simmons), a lion who is the noble, but pompous Mayor of Zootopia.
Mrs. Otterton (voiced by Octavia Spencer), a concerned North American river otter whose husband Emmitt has gone missing, and their mother of two children.
Duke Wealselton (voiced by Alan Tudyk), Duke Weaselton, a small-time least weasel crook also known for selling bootleg DVDs.
Gideon Grey (voiced by Phil Johnston), a red fox from Bunnyburrow who used to bully the young rabbits and sheep when he was young. As an adult, he has reconciled with those he tormented and became a much-respected baker.
Mr. Big (voiced by Maurice LaMarche), an Arctic shrew who is the most fearsome crime boss in Tundratown and is served by a group of polar bears.
Fru Fru (voiced by Leah Latham), an arctic shrew and Mr. Big's daughter who befriends Judy after she saves her from a runaway Donut sign in Little Rodentia. She also makes Judy the Godmother and namesake of her daughter.
Finnick (voiced by Tommy Lister Jr.), a fennec fox who is Nick's partner in crime.
Flash (voiced by Raymond S. Persi), the "fastest" three-toed sloth in the DMV (short for Department of Mammal Vehicles).
Priscilla (voiced by Kristen Bell), a three-toed sloth and Flash's co-worker at the DMV.
 Fabienne Growley and Peter Moosebridge (voiced by Fabienne Rawley and Peter Mansbridge), the snow leopard and moose anchors of the ZNN News.
 Jerry Jumbeaux Jr. (voiced by John DiMaggio), an ill-tempered African elephant who owns an ice cream parlor called Jumbeaux's Café, frequented by elephants and other larger mammals.
 Dr. Madge Honey Badger (voiced by Katie Lowes), a honey badger scientist who helps Mayor Lionheart look for the cause of the animals' savagery.
 Officer McHorn (voiced by Mark Rhino Smith), a black rhinoceros police officer who is part of the Zootopia Police Department's 1st Precinct.
Gazelle (voiced by Shakira), a Thomson's gazelle who is a famous pop star.

References
 Text was copied from Judy Hopps at the Zootopia Wiki, which is released under a Creative Commons Attribution-Share Alike 3.0 (Unported) (CC-BY-SA 3.0) license.

Lists of animated film characters
Animated characters by series
Lists of fictional animals in animation
Lists of fictional animals by work
Zootopia